Sion Hill is a historic landmark in Havre de Grace, Maryland, U.S.

Sion Hill may refer to:

 Sion Hill, U.S. Virgin Islands
 Sion Hill, Blackrock, Dublin, Ireland
 Dominican College Sion Hill, or Sion Hill, a school
 St Catherine's College of Education for Home Economics, or Sion Hill, a former teacher training college
 Sion Hill FC, a football club in the Sion Hill neighborhood of Arnos Vale, Saint Vincent and the Grenadines

See also

Mount Sion (disambiguation)
 Sion Hill Hall, Kirby Wiske, North Yorkshire, England
 Sion Hill Place, Bath, a building in Somerset, UK